Route 440 or Highway 440 may refer to:

Australia
 South Gippsland Highway

Canada
Manitoba Provincial Road 440
New Brunswick Route 440
Newfoundland and Labrador Route 440
 Quebec Autoroute 440

Japan
 Route 440 (Japan)

United States
  Interstate 440 (disambiguation)
  Arkansas Highway 440
  Hawaii Route 440
  Louisiana Highway 440
  Maryland Route 440
  New Jersey Route 440
  New York State Route 440
 Ohio State Route 440 (former)
  Puerto Rico Highway 440